Germantown is an unincorporated community in northern Liberty Township, Washington County, Ohio, United States.  It lies along the Paw Paw Creek near the boundary with Noble County.

History
Germantown had its start when a sawmill was built there. The town site was laid out in 1852.

References

Unincorporated communities in Washington County, Ohio